The 1989 Torneo Descentralizado, the top tier of Peruvian football was played by 42 teams in the format of Regional Tournaments. The national champion was Unión Huaral.

Due to the 1989 Copa América, a minor tournament (1989 Torneo Plácido Galindo) was played during the season by 42 clubs. The winner would qualify for the Liguilla Regional II Playoffs.

Regional I

Metropolitan

Central

North

Oriental

South

Liguilla playoff

Liguilla 

Sporting Cristal ganó un solo partido y empató cuatro. Derrotó 3-0 al Alianza Atlético y empató a cero goles con los otro cuatro equipos.

Final play-off

El martes 16 de Mayo de 1989 Sporting Cristal y Alianza Atlético disputan la final en el estadio Nacional ante 7,332 espectadores. Los goles fueron marcados por Martin Dall'Orso a los 24 minutos del primer tiempo y por Francesco Manassero a los 42 minutos del segundo tiempo.

Regional II

Metropolitan

North

Group A

Group B

South

Central

Oriental

Liguilla playoffs

Consolation playoffs

Liguilla Final

Championship Match

Title

Promotion playoff

External links
Peru 1989 season at RSSSF
Peruvian Football League News 

1989
Peruana
Torneo Descentralizado, 1989